FC Locomotive Tbilisi is a Georgian football club from the capital, Tbilisi. During the existence of the USSR the club was a part of the Lokomotiv Voluntary Sports Society. The club has strong connections with the Georgian Railways.

History
Locomotive was founded on 14 August 1936 as a part of Lokomotiv sports society. The club won Georgian championship in 1937, which gave them the permission to participate in USSR Top League. Their debut season in the highest level of the Soviet football championship came in 1938, where the club took 24th place out of 26 and got relegated. However, the Tbilisi-based club managed to get another promotion during the following season and participated in 1940 Soviet Top League. But they were eventually disqualified from the tournament. These were the only seasons when Locomotive managed to take part in the top league.

From the following years until the dissolution of USSR, the club moved between the lower divisions, played in the second the third divisions of the Soviet football championship.

Nodar Akhalkatsi, the coach of FC Dinamo Tbilisi and one of the most successful managers in the Soviet football, started his managing career in Locomotive. He managed the club from 1967 to 1970.

Since the post-Soviet era, Locomotive is one of the regular members of Erovnuli Liga. However, the club failed to win the championship. They were runners-up twice: in 2000-01 and in 2001–02 Umaglesi Liga. The club won Georgian Cup three times: in 2000, in 2002 and in 2005.

Some notable players of the club are: Levan Kenia, Levan Tskitishvili, Zurab Khizanishvili, Giorgi Arabidze, Giorgi Aburjania, Valeri Abramidze, Juan Diego González-Vigil and Endika Bordas.

Honours
Georgian Cup:
Winners (3): 1999–2000, 2001–2002, 2004–2005

European cups

Current squad
As of 14 September, 2022.

References

External links
 Official website
 Soccerway statistics

Association football clubs established in 1936
1936 establishments in Georgia (country)
 
Locomotive Tbilisi
Locomotive Tbilisi
Soviet Top League clubs